Bradley Santer (born 9 April 1982) is an Australian figure skater who competed in men's singles. He became a two-time Australian national champion (2003 and 2004) and appeared at multiple World and Four Continents Championships. He turned professional following the 2005–06 season.

On 27 June 2007, Disney announced that Santer would play the role of Troy Bolton in the east coast version of Disney's High School Musical: The Ice Tour.

Programs

Competitive highlights
JGP: Junior Grand Prix

References

External links

1982 births
Australian male single skaters
Living people